Whitney - The Concert for a New South Africa (alternately titled Whitney Houston – Live in South Africa, Whitney Houston - Concert for South Africa) was the title of three concerts which American singer Whitney Houston performed in South Africa to honor President Nelson Mandela in November 1994.

History
Houston's first ever performances in South Africa were at Kings Park Stadium in Durban on Nov. 8 and final one at Green Point Stadium in Cape Town on Nov. 19. 
These would make her the first major musician to visit the newly unified, post-apartheid nation following Mandela's winning election. The concert from Johannesburg, was released on VHS in December, 1994. All proceeds from the event were donated to South African charities including two children's museums, the President's Trust Fund, the Kagiso Foundation and several orphanages.

Set list
 "Love's in Need of Love Today"
 "So Emotional"
 "Saving All My Love for You"
 "I Wanna Dance with Somebody (Who Loves Me)"
 "How Will I Know"
 Medley: "I Love You" / "All at Once" / "Where You Are"
 "Lover for Life"
 "All the Man That I Need"
 "My Name Is Not Susan"
 "Queen of the Night"
 "I Have Nothing"
 "Touch the World" (performed with Cissy Houston and Tu Nokwe's Amajika Performing Arts choir)
 "Love Is"
 "Amazing Grace"
 "Wonderful Counselor"
 "Master Blaster (Jammin')"
 "I Will Always Love You"
 "I'm Every Woman"
 "Greatest Love of All"
 "Home"
 "I'm Every Woman (Reprise)"

Notes
The South Africa tour included "Where You Are" and "Lover for Life" never performed by Houston during any of her past tours. 
The November 12 HBO televised show was altered with "Nobody Loves Me Like You Do" and "Where Do Broken Hearts Go" not performed in medley. "All the Man That I Need" and "Wonderful Counselor" was also removed from the November 12 show.

Personnel
 Musical Director: Rickey Minor
 Bass guitar/Bass synthesizer: Rickey Minor
 Guitars: Paul Jackson, Jr.
 Keyboards: Bette Sussman, Wayne Linsey, Joe Wolfe
 Drums: Michael Baker
 Percussions: Bashiri Johnson
 Saxophones/EWI: Kirk Whalum, Gary Bias
 Trumpet: Michael "Patches" Stewart, Oscar Brashear
 Trombone: George Bohanon
 Background Vocalists: Olivia McClurkin, Alfie Silas, Pattie Howard
 Dancers: Carolyn Brown, Merlyn Mitchell, Shane Johnson, Saleema Mubaarak
 Little girls dancers: Fajallah Harper, Vanitey Ramdhan, Sylvia Enriquez, Mistey Ramdhan

References

External links
The Bodyguard Tour | Whitney Houston Official Site

Whitney Houston concerts